Duvalier is a French and Haitian surname, and may refer to:
 François Duvalier (1907–1971), nicknamed "Papa Doc", President of Haiti 1957–71
 Jean-Claude Duvalier (1951–2014), nicknamed "Baby Doc", son of François Duvalier and President of Haiti 1971–86
 Simone Ovid Duvalier (1913–1997), nicknamed "Mama Doc", widow of François Duvalier and mother of Jean-Claude Duvalier
 Michèle Bennett Duvalier (b. 1950), former wife of Jean-Claude Duvalier 1980–90